George F. Stewart (February 22, 1908 – March 18, 1982) was an American food scientist who was involved in processing, preservation, chemistry, and microbiology of poultry and egg-based food products. He also became the first president of the International Union of Food Science and Technology (IUFoST) after it was formed at the 1970 conference in Washington, D.C., from the International Congress of Food Science and Technology.

Early life and college
Born in Mesa, Arizona, Stewart developed an interest in the southwestern U.S. and the environment that never left him. He would earn a B.S. in Chemistry from the University of Chicago in 1930 and a Ph.D. in Dairy chemistry from Cornell University in 1933.

Industrial career
Stewart worked as a chemist for Ocoma Foods in Omaha, Nebraska, for five years. This gave him early experience in the dynamics of the food industry. The experience Stewart gained in the food industry would prove valuable when he returned to academia.

Iowa State University and World War II

University of California involvement
In 1951, Stewart joined the University of California, Davis faculty as chair of the Department of Avian Sciences (then known as Poultry Husbandry). He would lead the transition of the department between the University of California, Berkeley and Davis between 1951 and 1958 and expand the department in faculty and building size. Taking a sabbatical year in Australia as a Fulbright scholar in 1958, Stewart played a key role in modernizing Australia's poultry industry.

In 1959, Stewart returned to UC-Davis as chair of the Department of Food Science and Technology (FST) where he would serve until 1964. At the university's request in 1964, Stewart was named director of the food protection and toxicology center and became chair of the newly formed Department of Environmental Toxicology, a position he would hold until 1970.

Stewart returned to the FST department in 1970 as a teacher and researcher, including serving as coordinator of the Food packaging program from 1969 to 1974. He would retire from UC Davis in 1975.

Research focus
Stewart's research was on the processing and preservation of poultry meat and eggs. This included being the first person to demonstrate the browning reaction in dried eggs with a reaction between glucose and protein, the first to deal with time-temperature studies in egg pasteurization and poultry freezing, the first to determine antibiotic resistance in pathogenic bacteria in refrigerated poultry, and the first to determine the time between egg laying and egg shell composition to maintain internal product quality. His research would lead to over seventy-five published papers, the co-founding of Advances in Food Research in 1958, the co-founding of the Journal of Food Nutrition Education and Monographs in Food Science and Technology.

Professional involvement
Stewart was involved in many organizations, including IUFoST and the Institute of Food Technologists (IFT), serving as a charter member in 1939 and as IFT President in 1967-68. Among his service at IFT was being editor-in-chief of Food Technology and the Journal of Food Science (JFS) from January 1961 to July 1966. During his role as editor, Stewart would transfer much of the basic research from Food Technology to the Journal of Food Science, paving the way for JFS to be an entirely research scientific journal by 1971. He was also involved in the Poultry Science Association on its board of directors and was also named a fellow. Stewart was involved in other professional organizations, including the American Chemical Society, the American Dairy Science Association, the American Institute of Nutrition, the American Association for the Advancement of Science, Society for Nutrition Education and Behavior and the International Union of Nutritional Sciences.

Death and legacy

Awards and honors
Nicholas Appert Award (1974)

Selected work

References

External links

List of IFT past award winners
List of IFT Fellows
History of FST at UC-Davis

1908 births
1982 deaths
American food scientists
Cornell University alumni
Fellows of the Institute of Food Technologists
Iowa State University faculty
People from Mesa, Arizona
Scientists from Chicago
People from Iowa
People from New York (state)
University of California, Berkeley faculty
University of California, Davis faculty
University of Chicago alumni